Neptis columella, the short banded sailer, is a species of nymphalid butterfly found in South and Southeast Asia.

Description

Upperside black, with white markings. Forewing: discoidal streak widening towards apex, notched pre-apically on the anterior margin and obliquely truncate at apex; spot beyond large, broadly triangular, well separated; discal spots in pairs varying in size, spot of this series in interspace 1 always an elongate; spots in transverse postdiscal series obscure, not all well defined, margined on both sides with deeper black than that of the ground colour; the space between the series and the discal spots and also the terminal margin beyond it with obscure transverse pale markings. Hindwing: costal margin broadly greyish brown; subbasal band not extending to the costa, of varying width; discal and subterminal pale transverse lines, the space between them darker than the ground colour, traversed by a prominent series of postdiscal spots of varying size. Cilia white alternating with black. Underside ferruginous brown; white markings as on the upperside but broader; the pale markings between the discal and postdiscal series of spots, the subterminal markings on the upperside of the forewing, and the discal and subterminal pale lines on the upperside of the hindwing represented by pale lunular transverse whitish markings. The costal margin of the hindwing above vein 8 very broad, especially in the female. Antennae dark brown to black; head, thorax and abdomen dark brownish black; beneath white.

Distribution
Western and southern India, recorded from Our Panjal range Nowshera , Rajouri Jammu and Kashmir UT Mahabaleshwar near Mumbai, and the Nilgiris; Sikkim, Bhutan, through the hills of Assam, Myanmar and Tenasserim to the Malay Peninsula, Thailand and Sumatra.

Gallery

References

columella
Butterflies of Asia
Butterflies of Singapore
Butterflies of Indochina
Taxa named by Pieter Cramer
Butterflies described in 1780